The First Adenauer cabinet (German: Kabinett Adenauer I) was the 1st Government of Federal Republic of Germany in office from 20 September 1949 until 20 October 1953. It was the first democratically-elected German cabinet after World War II. The cabinet was formed after the 1949 elections. Konrad Adenauer reached an agreement on a coalition with the Free Democratic Party (FDP), German Party (DP) and his Christian Democratic Union (CDU) together with their Bavarian sister party Christian Social Union (CSU), setting the stage for Adenauer to become the first Chancellor of Germany. Franz Blücher (FDP) served as Vice-Chancellor of Germany and Federal Minister of Matters of the Marshall Plan. The cabinet was succeeded by the Second Adenauer cabinet.

Composition

|}

Notes

References

Adenauer I
Adenauer I
1949 establishments in West Germany
1953 disestablishments in West Germany
Cabinets established in 1949
Cabinets disestablished in 1953
C1